Celebrity Sweepstakes is an American television game show that aired on NBC's daytime schedule from April 1, 1974 to October 1, 1976. The show also had two separate weekly syndicated runs from September 9, 1974 to September 1975 and again from September 20, 1976 to September 1977.

Jim McKrell hosted the show. Bill Armstrong was the main announcer, with Dick Tufeld and John Harlan substituting. Joey Bishop and Carol Wayne were the regulars who appeared most often.  Other panelists included Clifton Davis, Buddy Hackett, George Hamilton, JoAnn Pflug and Freddie Prinze. CS was produced jointly by Ralph Andrews and Burt Sugarman. The first theme song was composed by Stan Worth, and the second by Alan Thicke.

Gameplay
The game used a horse racing motif as its premise. Two contestants (originally three in the early weeks) competed for the entire show, and started the game with $20 (sometimes $50) each, trying to predict which of six celebrities could correctly answer questions posed by the host. As stated by McKrell at the beginning of the show, the celebrities did not receive the questions in advance of the taping. However, the questions were based on biographical information that had been taken from the celebrities. This information (strengths and weaknesses) was provided to the audience and contestants via tip sheets, akin to actual horse racing forms.

Round 1
McKrell read a question and people in the studio audience then voted for the celebrity they believed could answer the question correctly. After the voting took place, a totalizator set odds on each celebrity. The celebrity who had the greatest vote of confidence from the audience was dubbed the "favorite" and had the lowest odds, frequently 1:1 (even money) or 2:1. A celebrity who had few or no audience votes was dubbed the "long shot" and had the highest odds, up to 99:1. The contestant in control that round then placed a bet on who he or she thought would answer correctly, as "$10 on Nipsey Russell".

In the show's last 13 weeks, the audience was told the category of the question before selecting celebrities.

Contestants could bet $2, $5, or $10 (unless he or she had $10 or less, at which point the bet defaulted automatically to $2) or up to $100, if he or she bet on the favorite. Near the end of the show's run, contestants could not bet more than $10 less than their total when doing this.

A correct answer added the value of the bet multiplied by that celebrity's odds to the contestant's score (a $10 bet on a celebrity with the right answer and his/her odds are at 5:1 would win $50). A wrong answer lost the value of the bet and the opponent could then make a bet of his or her own on that same question. If no celebrity had the correct answer, the question would be thrown out (known as a "scratch" and indicated by a loud horn) and replaced. If either player dropped down to less than the minimum $2 bet, both players were given $2 (or $1 if that player already had $1). The first round lasted for an unspecified time limit.

Near the end of the show's run, the celebrities no longer wrote down answers. This made the game run quicker, and made it more likely that a question would be answered, since if the current player's celebrity got the answer wrong the other celebrities now knew that it was a wrong answer.

Homestretch
In round two, called the Home Stretch round, contestants had the opportunity to double their bets by picking a second celebrity with the correct answer. In the earliest and latest parts of the run, the contestant would lose any money won on the first celebrity if the second celebrity got it wrong, but the contestant had the option of not choosing a second celebrity. If only one celebrity had the correct answer, a bell dubbed the "ice cream bell" (as it sounded like something an old-fashioned ice cream salesman would ring when going around the neighborhood) would ring; selecting the correct celebrity would automatically double the payout.

The All or Nothing Question
The odds for each celebrity were determined by how well they had performed during the show for the final question of the game. The odds were calculated based upon the number of incorrect answers given by a celebrity, so that a celebrity missing two questions was given 2:1 odds, four misses resulted in 4:1 odds, and so on; odds for celebrities who didn't miss any questions were given at even money (1:1). Later in the run, the audience set the odds one more time; at first, the maximum odds were 8:1, but by the end of the run this changed to 5:1. The two players secretly and simultaneously selected their celebrities, as well as whether to bet everything they had or none of it.

There was a significant prize, usually worth around $1,000, for anyone who bet "all" and lost. Both players kept any cash won on the show. The player with the highest cash total won the game. Originally, if the game ended in a tie both players came back, but this changed to both players leaving if they both lost everything on the last question. Originally, players could stay on until defeated, and they won a car for every three wins. The limit later became three days, then five (with five wins needed for the car, but it was then changed back to three wins for the car, although the five-game limit remained).

On the syndicated versions, two different contestants (no returning champions) played each week. The winner of the game received a bonus prize.

Later in the syndicated version, a "fanfare" played during the game meant that the contestants also had a chance to predict how many celebrities had the correct answer. If either prediction, or both, were correct, the player(s) won a bonus prize package called the "exacta". This was also added to the NBC version in the last 13 weeks of its run, although they added a rule where the two players had to choose different numbers.

Promotions
The program was involved in NBC's first cross-game promotion, held on St. Patrick's Day in 1975 and called "Shamrock Sweepstakes". Players from NBC's six daytime game shows at the time (Sweepstakes, High Rollers, Wheel of Fortune, Hollywood Squares, Jackpot!, and Blank Check) answered a set of questions dealing with Ireland and Irish/Irish-American people; the one who got the most correct won $100,000.

A later promotion involved home contestants; over a week, celebrities played the game (mainly actors from NBC soap operas, although Chuck Woolery and Susan Stafford of Wheel of Fortune appeared on the last day), each playing for someone at home. In order to win, the home player had to answer the phone when called. (One contestant would have had the lead, but her phone was busy; fortunately, she was drawn by another celebrity, who ended up with the highest score.) The top three celebrities (whose home contestants answered the phone) won their game amounts for their home contestants, plus an extra $75,000 to the winner, $20,000 for second, and $5,000 for third.

Episode status
The episode status of Celebrity Sweepstakes is unclear. It is possible that the series was destroyed as per network policy at the time. The pilot and finale both circulate among collectors, and a 1975 episode from the Warhol collection is held by The Paley Center for Media in New York, as well as two other episodes. The final episode can also be currently viewed on YouTube.  In addition, the last 30 seconds of the January 6, 1975 show exist on audio tape, which features Chuck Woolery promoting the premiere of Wheel of Fortune. Additionally, about 2 minutes and 20 seconds of the March 18, 1975 episode recorded off WAVE in Louisville and featuring a clip of the Shamrock Sweepstakes mentioned above has surfaced and can be viewed at the FuzzyMemories website.

The status of the syndicated versions is also unclear. It had been assumed by traders that these episodes, along with the daytime episodes, were in the possession of producer Burt Sugarman. On January 9, 2013, host Jim McKrell was interviewed on the Shokus Radio program "Stu's Show" and seemed to contradict this, saying that the entire run of Celebrity Sweepstakes was destroyed due to the issues of dual ownership between Sugarman and Ralph Andrews.

Foreign versions

United Kingdom
The Sweepstakes Game, using a similar format with Bernard Braden as host, ran for 13 weeks on LWT from July 3 to September 25, 1976. A fourteenth episode later aired as a Christmas special.

Japan
Quiz Derby, with similar rules but only five celebrities, was a much more popular version than both its American and British counterparts. It ran weekly from 1976–1992.

Australia
In September 1977, ATV-0 in Melbourne premiered All-Star Sweepstakes with John Newman as host. The series lasted until January 1978.

References

NBC original programming
First-run syndicated television programs in the United States
1970s American comedy game shows
1974 American television series debuts
1977 American television series endings
Television series by Ralph Andrews Productions
Television series by 20th Century Fox Television
English-language television shows
1970s British game shows
1970s Australian game shows